The accession of Serbia to the European Union (EU) has been on the current agenda for the future enlargement of the EU since 2012 when it became a candidate for accession. Serbia officially applied for European Union membership on 22 December 2009.  Accession negotiations are currently ongoing.  Serbia is expected to complete its negotiations by the end of 2024, allowing it to join the European Union by 2025.

It is one of eight current EU candidate countries, together with Albania, Bosnia and Herzegovina, Moldova, Montenegro, North Macedonia, Turkey and Ukraine.

History

Identification
Negotiations with the Federal Republic of Yugoslavia (later the State Union of Serbia and Montenegro) intensified following the election defeat and ousting of Slobodan Milošević in 2000, and the EU officially declared the Balkan states potential candidates for membership following the EU-Western Balkans Summit in Thessaloniki on 21 June 2003.

Stabilisation and Association Agreement
On 7 November 2007, Serbia initiated a Stabilisation and Association Agreement (SAA) with the European Union.  The SSA came into force on 1 September 2013.

Recommendation
The European Commission recommended making Serbia an official candidate on 12 October 2011.  The Council also made the recommendation on 28 February 2012.

Candidacy
Serbia received full candidate status on 1 March 2012.  In December 2013, the Council of the European Union approved opening negotiations for Serbia's accession.

Application
Serbia officially applied for European Union membership on 22 December 2009.

Developmental Aid
Until 2020, Serbia had been receiving €2.9bn of developmental aid from the Instrument for Pre-Accession Assistance, a funding mechanism for EU candidate countries.

Chronology of relations with the EU

Foreign Policy

Serbia refused to join Western sanctions against Russia following its 2022 invasion of Ukraine.  In response, the European Parliament passed a resolution that stated in part it "strongly regrets Serbia’s non-alignment with EU sanctions against Russia, which damages its EU accession process."

Serbia and Kosovo

The biggest obstacle to Serbia's accession to the EU is its strained relationship with Kosovo, which declared its independence on 17 February 2008.

The Serbian government has declared that the status of Kosovo should not be tied to the EU negotiations.  In September 2012, the EU Enlargement Commissioner, Štefan Füle, denied that the European Union would insist on Serbia's recognition of Kosovo before it can join the organisation.

On 19 April 2013, the governments of Kosovo and Serbia completed the Brussels Agreement, which was hailed as a major step towards normalising relations and enabled the start of EU accession talks with Serbia.

In November 2013, Kosovo's Minister of Foreign Affairs Enver Hoxhaj suggested that the EU should approve the accession of Kosovo and Serbia simultaneously due to concerns that if Serbia was admitted first they could veto Kosovo's membership. However, Serbia's accession negotiations were not halted.

In March 2021, the European Parliament adopted a report on Serbia, which, amongst other things, emphasized that the normalization of relationships between Serbia and Kosovo is "a priority and a requirement for EU accession".

Negotiations

Public opinion 
Serbs used to be pro-Europeanism in the past because of having better relationships with Europe as well as economical reasons. However, in the last decades because of the support of Kosovo’s independence by most European countries, the economic crisis, the better relationships with the United States in addition to giving sanctions against Russia during the Russian invasion in Ukraine, support for EU membership went down. At present, more Serbs have become more opposed to the Western NATO bloc and prefer better ties and relationships with, for example, Russia for her Greek Orthodox Christian Slavic traditions and China with its large economy.

A 2022 NSPM poll released in October recorded that 48,8% were against joining the EU, compared to 34,7%. The rest did not answer or refused to give the answer. Another poll recorded the question "If recognizing the independence of Kosovo were a condition of joining the EU, do you think that condition should be accepted?", 79,60% answered no, compared to only 8,30% who said yes.

Visa liberalisation process
On 1 January 2008, the Visa Facilitation and Readmission Agreement between Serbia and the EU came into effect.  On 19 December 2009, Visa requirements were lifted for Serbs travelling to Schengen countries.

Impact of joining

See also
 Enlargement of NATO
 Euro-Slavism 
 Croatia–Serbia relations
 Accession of Kosovo to the European Union
 Accession of Montenegro to the European Union

References

Further reading

External links
 Ministry of Foreign Affairs of Serbia
 The EU integration Office
 War crimes, conditionality and EU integration in the Western Balkans, by Vojin Dimitrijević, Florence Hartmann, Dejan Jović, Tija Memišević, edited by Judy Batt, Jelena Obradović, Chaillot Paper No. 116, June 2009, European Union Institute for Security Studies

Serbia
Foreign relations of Serbia
Serbia–European Union relations